José Gregorio Quijada (born November 9, 1995) is a Venezuelan professional baseball pitcher for the Los Angeles Angels of Major League Baseball (MLB). He previously played for the Miami Marlins.

Professional career

Miami Marlins
Quijada was signed as an international free agent by the Miami Marlins on September 9, 2013. He made his professional debut in 2014 for the Rookie-level Dominican Summer League Marlins, going 5–5 with a 2.91 ERA in 74 innings. In 2015, he pitched 8 innings for the Rookie-level Gulf Coast League Marlins, going 0–0 with a 0.00 ERA. He split the 2016 season between the Class A Greensboro Grasshoppers and the Class A-Advanced Jupiter Hammerheads, accumulating a 5–2 record with a 2.32 ERA over 50 innings. His 2017 was split between Jupiter and the Double-A Jacksonville Jumbo Shrimp, accumulating a 5–1 record with a 3.23 ERA over 55.2 innings. He split his 2018 season between Jacksonville and the Triple-A New Orleans Baby Cakes, going 2–6 with a 3.00 ERA over 62.1 innings. 

The Marlins added him to their 40-man roster after the 2018 season. He opened the 2019 season with New Orleans. On April 23, he was promoted to the major league roster for the first time. He made his major league debut on April 24, pitching  of an inning in relief. His first decision was a loss to the Chicago Cubs on May 8 that year; he allowed a walk-off solo home run to Jason Heyward in the 11th inning. He was optioned to New Orleans three days later. On February 3, 2020, Quijada was designated for assignment by the Marlins.

Los Angeles Angels
Quijada was claimed off waivers by the Los Angeles Angels on February 10, 2020. On September 11, 2020, Quijada surrendered a walk-off grand slam to Charlie Blackmon of the Colorado Rockies. On the year, Quijada pitched to a 7.36 ERA with 6 strikeouts in 3.2 innings pitched.

On July 30, 2021, the Angels recalled Quijada from the Triple-A Salt Lake Bees. On October 1, 2021, in a game against a Seattle Mariners team attempting to make the playoffs for the first time in 20 years, Quijada entered the game with baserunners on first and third and no outs. He proceeded to strike out all three batters, thwarting an opportunity for Seattle to take the lead and win the game, greatly hurting the team's chances of making the playoffs. In 2021, Quijada made 26 appearances, posting an 0–2 record, 4.56 ERA, and  innings pitched.

References

External links

1995 births
Living people
People from Monagas
Venezuelan expatriate baseball players in the United States
Major League Baseball players from Venezuela
Major League Baseball pitchers
Miami Marlins players
Los Angeles Angels players
Dominican Summer League Marlins players
Venezuelan expatriate baseball players in the Dominican Republic
Gulf Coast Marlins players
Greensboro Grasshoppers players
Jupiter Hammerheads players
Jacksonville Jumbo Shrimp players
New Orleans Baby Cakes players
Caribes de Anzoátegui players
Salt Lake Bees players
2023 World Baseball Classic players